Dance Fever is a 1979 American musical variety series.

Dance Fever may also refer to:

 Dance Fever (2003 TV series)
 Dance Fever (album), a 2022 Florence and the Machine album
 "Dance Fever", a 2004 episode of George Lopez
 "Dance Fever!", a 1998 episode of Bear in the Big Blue House